BLB may refer to:
 Bad Berleburg, Germany, vehicle registration
 Blacklight Blue, a fluorescent black light emitting negligible visible light
 Blue Letter Bible
 Former USAF Howard Air Force Base, Panama, IATA code